Rail transport in Australia is a component of the Australian transport system. It is to a large extent state-based, as each state largely has its own operations, with the interstate network being developed ever since Australia's federation in 1901. , around 11 per cent of the Australian heavy railways network route-kilometres are electrified.

Except for a small number of private railways, most of the Australian railway network infrastructure is government-owned, either at the federal or state level. The Australian federal government is involved in the formation of national policies, and provides funding for national projects.

National issues

Uniform gauge

Very little thought was given in the early years of the development of the colony-based rail networks of Australia-wide interests. The most obvious issue to arise was determining a track gauge. Despite advice from London to adopt a uniform gauge, should the lines of the various colonies ever meet, gauges were adopted in different colonies, and indeed within colonies, without reference to those of other colonies. This has caused problems ever since.

Attempts to fix the gauge problem are by no means complete. For example, the Mount Gambier line is isolated by gauge and of no operational value.

Electrification 

With the electrification of suburban networks, which began in 1919, a consistent electric rail traction standard was not adopted. Electrification began in Melbourne in 1919 using 1500 V DC. Sydney's lines were electrified from 1926 using 1500 V DC, Brisbane's from 1979 using 25 kV AC, and Perth's from 1992 using 25 kV AC. There has also been extensive non-urban electrification in Queensland using 25 kV AC, mainly during the 1980s for the coal routes. From 2014 Adelaide's lines are being gradually electrified at 25 kV AC. 25 kV AC voltage has now become the international standard.

History

The first railways in Australia were built by private companies, based in the then colonies of New South Wales, Victoria and South Australia.

The first railway was privately owned and operated and commissioned by the Australian Agricultural Company in Newcastle in 1831, a cast-iron fishbelly rail on an inclined plane as a gravitational railway servicing A Pit coal mine. The first steam-powered line opened in Victoria in 1854. The four km long Flinders Street to Sandridge line was opened by the Melbourne & Hobson's Bay Railway Company at the height of the Victorian gold rush.

In these early years there was very little thought of Australia-wide interests in developing the colony-based networks. The most obvious issue to arise was determining a uniform gauge for the continent. Despite advice from London to adopt a uniform gauge, should the lines of the various colonies ever meet, gauges were adopted in different colonies, and indeed within colonies, without reference to those of other colonies. This example has caused problems ever since at the national level.

In the 1890s, the establishment of an Australian Federation from the six colonies was debated. One of the points of discussion was the extent that railways would be a federal responsibility. A vote to make it so was lost narrowly, instead the new constitution allows "the acquisition, with the consent of a State, of any railways of the State on terms arranged between the Commonwealth and the State" (Section 51 xxxiii) and "railway construction and extension in any State with the consent of that State" (Section 51 xxxiv). However, the Australian Government is free to provide funding to the states for rail upgrading projects under Section 96 ("the Parliament may grant financial assistance to any State on such terms and conditions as the Parliament thinks fit").

Suburban electrification began in Melbourne in 1919 (1500 V DC). Sydney's lines were electrified from 1926 (1500 V DC), Brisbane's from 1979 (25 kV AC), and Perth's from 1992 (25 kV AC). Mainline electrification was first carried out in Victoria in 1954, closely followed by New South Wales which continued to expand their network. These networks have fallen into decline, in contrast to Queensland where 25 kV AC equipment was introduced from the 1980s for coal traffic.

Diesel locomotives were introduced to Australian railways from the early 1950s. Most units were of local design and construction, using imported British or American technology and power equipment. The three major firms were Clyde Engineering partnered with GM-EMD, Goninan with General Electric, and AE Goodwin (later Comeng) with the American Locomotive Company (ALCO). The major British company was English Electric, with Swiss firm Sulzer also supplying some equipment. This continues today, with Downer Rail and UGL Rail the modern incarnations of Clyde and Goninan respectively.

Milestones
1831 – New South Wales – Australian Agricultural Company's cast-iron fishbelly rail on an inclined plane as a gravitational railway servicing A Pit coal mine.
1837 – New South Wales – Australian Agricultural Company's cast-iron fishbelly rail on an inclined plane as a gravitational railway servicing B Pit coal mine.
1842 – New South Wales – Australian Agricultural Company's cast-iron fishbelly rail on an inclined plane as a gravitational railway servicing C Pit coal mine.
1854 – South Australia – (horse-drawn line) Goolwa to Port Elliot
1854 – Victoria – First steam powered railway from Melbourne to Sandridge (Port Melbourne).
1855 – New South Wales – standard gauge steam powered railway from Sydney to Parramatta opened.
1856 – South Australia – broad gauge Adelaide to Port Adelaide railway opened
1865 – Queensland – narrow gauge Ipswich to Bigges Camp (renamed Grandchester in honour of occasion) on the way to Toowoomba railway opened, first narrow gauge main line in the world.
1871 – Tasmania – Deloraine to Launceston railway opened as broad gauge, converted to narrow gauge in 1888
1879 – Western Australia – narrow gauge Geraldton to Northampton railway opened
1883 – Railways of New South Wales and Victoria meet at Albury
1887 – Railways of Victoria and South Australia meet at Serviceton
1888 – Railways of New South Wales and Queensland meet at Wallangara
1889 – Western Australia's first land grant railway opened, the narrow gauge Great Southern Railway, completed from Beverley to Albany, linking Perth to the colony's only deep-water port
1889 – Northern Territory – narrow gauge Darwin to Pine Creek railway opened
1891 – Western Australia – first sections of narrow gauge privately funded land grant Midland Railway opened, completed from Midland Junction to Walkaway in 1894.
1915 – Standard gauge Canberra to Queanbeyan railway opened
1917 – Standard gauge Trans-Australian Railway completed between Kalgoorlie and Port Augusta
1919 – Railways of New South Wales and South Australia meet at Broken Hill with break-of-gauge
1919 – First electric suburban trains run in Melbourne
1924 – Final section of North Coast line opens, linking Cairns to the rest of the Australian railway system
1925 – Great White Train is created to promote industry and tours in New South Wales.
1930 – Standard gauge Sydney–Brisbane railway completed with trains crossing the Clarence River on a train ferry until the opening of a bridge at Grafton in 1932.
1937 – Trans-Australian Railway extended to Port Pirie Junction and the broad gauge railway from Adelaide to Redhill extended to Port Pirie Ellen Street
1954 – first main line electrification, from Dandenong to Traralgon in Victoria
1962 – Albury to Melbourne standard gauge railway opened, completing the Sydney–Melbourne railway
1966 – Western Australia's first private standard gauge railway opened – the Goldsworthy railway transported iron ore 112 km from Mount Goldsworthy mine to Port Hedland
1968 – Kalgoorlie to Perth standard gauge railway opened
1969 – Broken Hill to Port Pirie standard gauge railway opened, completing the Sydney–Perth railway
1980 – Tarcoola to Alice Springs standard gauge railway opened
1982 – Adelaide to Crystal Brook standard gauge railway opened
1989 – Electrification of the final section of the Brisbane-Rockhampton line, completing a ~2,100 km electrified network
1995 – Melbourne–Adelaide railway standard gauge railway completed
2004 – Adelaide–Darwin railway standard gauge railway completed

Government funding

While Australian federal governments have provided substantial funding for the upgrading of roads, since the 1920s they have not regularly funded investment in railways except for their own railway, the Commonwealth Railways, later Australian National Railways, which was privatised in 1997. They have considered the funding of railways owned by State Governments to be a State responsibility.

Nevertheless, Australian governments have made loans to the states for gauge standardisation projects from the 1920s to the 1970s. From the 1970s to 1996, the Australian Government has provided some grant funding to the States for rail projects, particularly the Keating Government's One Nation program, announced in 1992, which was notable for standardising the Adelaide to Melbourne line in 1995. Significant government funding was also made available for the Alice Springs to Darwin line, opened in 2004. Substantial funding is now being made available for freight railways through the Australian Rail Track Corporation and the AusLink land transport funding program.

Australian Rail Track Corporation
The Australian Rail Track Corporation (ARTC) is a federal government owned corporation established in 1997 that owns, leases, maintains and controls the majority of main line standard gauge railway lines on the mainland of Australia, known as the Designated Interstate Rail Network (DIRN).

In 2003 the Australian and New South Wales Governments agreed that ARTC would lease the NSW interstate and Hunter Valley networks for 60 years. As part of this agreement, ARTC agreed to a $872 million investment programme on the interstate rail network. The funding sources for the investment included an Australian Government equity injection into ARTC of $143 million and a funding contribution of almost $62 million by the New South Wales Government.

AusLink
Under the AusLink program introduced in July 2004, the Australian Government has introduced the opportunity for rail to gain access to funds on a similar basis to that of roads. AusLink established a defined national network (superseding the former National Highway system) of important road and rail infrastructure links and their intermodal connections.

Rail funding has been announced for signalling upgrades to numerous railway lines, gauge conversion of existing broad gauge lines in Victoria to standard gauge, new rail links to intermodal freight precincts, and extensions to existing crossing loops to permit longer trains to operate.

Funding is focused on the National Network, including the following rail corridors, connecting at one or both ends to State Capital Cities:
 Sydney–Melbourne railway
 Sydney–Brisbane railway
Sydney to Adelaide, via Sydney–Melbourne railway to Cootamundra and then the Cootamundra–Parkes line, Parkes–Crystal Brook line and the Adelaide–Darwin railway
 Melbourne-Adelaide railway
Adelaide to Perth – Sydney–Perth railway
 Adelaide–Darwin railway
Brisbane to Townsville – the North Coast railway line in Queensland
Townsville to Mount Isa
 Hobart to Burnie, including link to Bell Bay, Tasmania
Melbourne to Mildura via Geelong
 Sydney to Dubbo
Some urban links in Sydney, Melbourne, Brisbane, Perth and Adelaide, connecting the long distance links to each other and to ports and airports
 Hunter Region rail links from Dubbo to Newcastle via the Dubbo-Merrygoen, Merrygoen–Binnaway, Binnaway–Werris Creek and Werris Creek–Port of Newcastle lines and the Merrygoen–Gulgong, Merrygoen–Sandy Hollow and Sandy Hollow–Muswellbrook lines

Infrastructure Australia 
After the 2007 federal election, the government body Infrastructure Australia was created to oversee all rail, road, airports and other infrastructure at a national level.

Rail infrastructure

Construction and maintenance of network infrastructure is consolidated into non-profit government bodies and contracted private: in the case of the interstate network and various non-urban railways of New South Wales, Victoria and Western Australia, the Australian Government-owned Australian Rail Track Corporation (ARTC); the New South Wales Regional Network, John Holland Rail; and rail infrastructure throughout the southern half of Western Australia, Arc Infrastructure.

ARTC "has a working relationship with Queensland Rail about the use of the 127 kilometres of standard gauge line between the Queensland border and Fisherman Island. ARTC intends to start discussions with Queensland about leasing this track once the NSW arrangements are bedded down". ARTC also maintains the NSW Hunter Valley network under contract.

On 1 January 2012, John Holland commenced the operation and maintenance of the New South Wales Regional Network under contract from Transport for NSW, comprising 2,700 kilometres of operational freight and passenger rail lines.

Arc Infrastructure has a lease until 2049 on 5,100 kilometres of Western Australian rail infrastructure, from Geraldton in the north, to Leonora and Kalgoorlie in the east, and south to Esperance, Albany and Bunbury. It is responsible for maintaining the network and granting access to operators.

Other railways continue to be integrated, although access to their infrastructure is generally required under National Competition Policy principles agreed by the Federal, State and Territory governments:
 Queensland – Queensland Rail and Aurizon
 Tasmania – TasRail
 Victorian non-interstate lines – V/Line and Metro Trains Melbourne
 South Australian non-interstate lines – One Rail Australia
 Tarcoola-Darwin line – One Rail Australia

Inland Rail is a railway construction project extending from Melbourne to Brisbane along a route west of the Great Dividing Range. Construction in stages commenced in 2018 and is scheduled to be completed in 2025, using existing routes where appropriate.

Operators

Rail freight

The major freight operators on the rail networks (excluding integrated mining railways) are:
 Aurizon
 Pacific National
 Qube Logistics
 SCT Logistics

Other rail freight operators include:
 Bowmans Rail
 East Coast Rail
 Southern Shorthaul Railroad
 TasRail

Licensing of personnel with nationally recognised credentials facilitates the transfer of those employees from one state or operator to another, as traffic demands.

Total freight movement
Including the mining railways, in 2015–16, there were 413.5 billion tonne kilometres of freight moved by rail. Overall railway freight in Australia is dominated by bulk freight, primarily iron ore and coal. In 2015–16, Australian railways carried over 1.34 billion tonnes of freight, 97 per cent of which were bulk movements. Intrastate bulk freight in Western Australia, principally iron-ore movements, accounted for 61 per cent of national rail freight tonnes. Bulk movements in Queensland and NSW, principally coal, were 17 per cent and 14 per cent, respectively.

Long-distance passenger 

Unlike the United States, Canada, and the United Kingdom, Long-distance rail and regional rail in Australia mostly operates on a state-by-state basis. The main companies that provide service are Journey Beyond, NSW TrainLink, Queensland Rail and V/Line.

Journey Beyond operates four long-distance trains, the first three being upmarket "experiential" services:
 Indian Pacific (Sydney–Adelaide–Perth): 1 round trip per week
 The Ghan (Adelaide–Alice Springs–Darwin): 1 round trip per week except during summer
 Great Southern (Adelaide–Brisbane): 1 round trip per week during summer
 The Overland (Melbourne–Adelaide): 2 round trips per week

New South Wales government-controlled NSW TrainLink operates ten long-distance passenger routes. All routes originate from Sydney:
Grafton XPT: daily
Casino XPT: daily
Brisbane XPT: daily
Canberra Xplorer: 3 round trips per day
Melbourne XPT: 2 round trips per day
Griffith Xplorer: 2 round trip per week
Central West XPT (to Dubbo): daily
Outback Xplorer (to Broken Hill): 1 round trip per week
Armidale Xplorer: daily
Moree Xplorer: daily

V/Line, a Victorian government-owned not-for-profit statutory corporation, operates both regional and long-distance services along the Victorian regional network. V/Line operates eight long-distance services from Melbourne:
 Warrnambool line: 5 round trips per weekday, 3 round trips per Sat/Sun
 Ararat line: 5 round trips per weekday, 3 round trips per Sat/Sun
 Maryborough line: 2 round trips per day
 Swan Hill line: 2 round trips per day
 Echuca line: 3 round trips per weekday, 2 round trips per Sat/Sun
 Shepparton line: 5 round trips per weekday, 3 round trips per Sat/Sun
 Albury line: 3 round trips per day
 Bairnsdale line: 3 round trips per Mon–Sat, 2 round trips to Bairnsdale and 1 round trip to Sale per Sun 

Queensland Rail, a state entity, operates several passenger lines under its train subsidiary. Five routes target the domestic market:
 Spirit of Queensland (Brisbane–Cairns): 3 round trips per week
 Electric Tilt Train (Brisbane–Rockhampton): 12 round trips per week
 Spirit of the Outback (Brisbane–Longreach): 2 round trips per week
 The Westlander (Brisbane–Charleville): 2 round trips per week
 The Inlander (Townsville–Mount Isa): 2 round trips per week

An additional three Queensland Rail routes are aimed at providing tourist services:
 The Savannahlander (Cairns–Forsayth): 1 round trip per week (operated under private contract)
 The Gulflander (Normanton–Croydon): 1 round trip per week
 Kuranda Scenic Railway (Cairns–Kuranda): daily

The Public Transport Authority, a government agency of Western Australia, operates various buses and four long-distance rail routes through its Transwa subsidiary. All routes originate from Perth:
 The Prospector: (Perth-Kalgoorlie) 9 round trips per week
 AvonLink: (Perth (Midland)–Northam) 1 round trip per day
 MerredinLink: (Perth–Merredin) 3 round trips per week
 The Australind: (Perth–Bunbury) 2 round trips per day

Urban rail 

Sydney Trains is the state government operator of the Sydney suburban railway network, which is part of the Transport for NSW network.
Metro Trains Sydney, a private entity whose majority owner is MTR Corporation, operates the Sydney Metro rapid transit line on behalf of Transport for NSW.
NSW TrainLink, the intercity counterpart of Sydney Trains, provides local suburban services in Newcastle and Wollongong on behalf of Transport for NSW. It also provides services between regional centres and Sydney. These services largely run using double-decker electric trains, with some of the rolling stock used on intercity services shared with Sydney Trains.
Metro Trains Melbourne, a private entity whose majority owner is MTR Corporation, operates the Melbourne suburban railway network on behalf of Public Transport Victoria.
V/Line, a state government organisation, operates the Victorian regional rail network, including some services within metropolitan Melbourne, and between Melbourne and regional centres on behalf of Public Transport Victoria.
Queensland Rail through their City network division (formerly Citytrain) is the state government operator of the South East Queensland railway network, which is part of the TransLink network.
Transperth operates the six lines of the Perth suburban rail network.
Keolis Downer operates the Adelaide suburban railway network on behalf of Adelaide Metro. This system features six lines.

Urban light rail and trams
Yarra Trams, which is a subsidiary of Keolis Downer, operates the 250 km, 29 lines of the Melbourne tram network.
 Transdev operates the 24.7 km Sydney light rail network, on behalf of Transport for NSW.
 Keolis Downer operates G:link, a 20 km light rail line on the Gold Coast. The line is part of the TransLink network.
 Torrens Connect operates the Glenelg tram line in Adelaide. The line is part of the Adelaide Metro network.
 Canberra Metro Operations, a private joint venture between John Holland and Pacific Partnerships, operates the 12 km Canberra Metro light rail line. This line is part of the Transport Canberra network.
 Keolis Downer, locally branded as Newcastle Transport, operated on behalf of Transport for NSW, operates the 2.7 km Newcastle Light Rail line.

Tourist and heritage railways 

There are many heritage railways and heritage tramways in Australia, often run by community organisations and preservation societies. There are also some privately operated passenger services, such as:

Skitube is a private railway in the New South Wales snowfields. Owned by the Perisher Ski Resort, it connects the main entrance of this tourist destination with ski areas that are inaccessible via road. The line mainly operates underground.
The Byron Bay Train service operates as a shuttle between Byron Bay station in the Byron Bay township and North Beach station. The privately run service operates on a 3 km section of the disused Murwillimbah line.

Private railways

Cane
Tramways with  gauge for the transport of sugarcane have always been operated as private concerns associated with the relevant sugar cane mill. These tramways are quite advanced technically, with hand-me-down rails cascaded from the normal rails, remote-controlled brake vans, concrete sleepers in places, and tamping machines in miniature. The twenty or so separate tramways cooperate in research and development.

Timber
Tramways were often associated with the transport of timber to sawmills. Various gauges were used, including the  gauge, which was also commonly used for cane haulage.

Wider gauges were sometimes used as well; Queensland had a number of 991 mm (3 ft 3 in) systems, some on wooden rails. In some areas  was used, a considerable investment of resources. In the early 21st century, the disused Queensland Rail line to Esk  in the Brisbane Valley was used for timber haulage.

Iron ore 
Five isolated heavy duty railways for the cartage of iron ore in the Pilbara region of Western Australia have always been private concerns operated as part of the production line between mine and port, initially commencing in 1966 with Goldsworthy Mining Associates' Goldsworthy railway, and recently in 2008 with Fortescue Metals Group's Fortescue railway and in 2015 with Roy Hill Holdings' Roy Hill railway. These lines are continually optimising axle loads (currently the heaviest in the world) and train lengths, that have pushed the limit of the wheel to rail interface and led to much useful research of value to railways worldwide. An open access sixth standard gauge iron ore network was proposed to the Oakajee Port in the Mid-West region to the south of the Pilbara but the project is currently on hold pending a viable business case.

High-speed rail

Medium-speed passenger services

Several medium-speed rail services operate on existing track that has been upgraded to accommodate faster services and/or tilting technology. Some of these services use high-speed capable rolling stock.

 In Western Australia, Westrail began using high-speed diesel railcars in 1971 on The Prospector service from Perth to Kalgoolie, and set a new Australian speed record. The same type of cars are used on the AvonLink service.
 New South Wales commenced operations with the XPT in 1982. The train is not often used to its full potential, operating along winding steam-era alignments. New South Wales trialled the Swedish X 2000 tilt train in 1995. Propelled by two specially modified XPT power cars, the train carried passengers between Sydney and Canberra in an eight-week trial.
 Queensland Rail's Electric Tilt Train service operates from Brisbane to Rockhampton, while the Diesel Tilt Train service runs from Brisbane to Cairns.
In the early stages of the project, the Victorian Government incorrectly referred to it as the 'Fast Train' or 'Very Fast Train', and this practice continues among some politicians and members of the public.

High-speed rail 

High speed rail has been repeatedly raised as an option since the 1980s, and has had bipartisan support for research and land purchase.

The focus usually falls on Sydney to Melbourne, where it is seen as a competitor to the busy Sydney–Melbourne air corridor, with Sydney to Brisbane also proposed. The benefits of regional city development are frequently raised.

A detailed study was undertaken from 2011 to 2013, after which the government indicated it would start purchasing land for a rail corridor. In 2016 the prime minister indicated a high-speed rail link might be funded privately and by value capture.

The Queensland Rail Electric Tilt Train's record speed of 210 km/h is just above the internationally accepted definition of high-speed rail of 200 km/h (120 mph). The maximum test speed of 193 km/h set by NSW TrainLink's XPT is approximately that. The Transwa WDA/WDB/WDC class railcars used on the medium-speed Transwa Prospector service are high-speed capable, but are limited to 160 km/h in service. The XPT is also theoretically capable of reaching speeds of 200 km/h.

References

External links